Ghatiana is a genus of freshwater crabs, found among the Western Ghats in India.

Species 
 Ghatiana atropurpurea 
 Ghatiana aurantiaca 
 Ghatiana basalticola 
 Ghatiana botti 
 Ghatiana durrelli 
 Ghatiana dvivarna 
 Ghatiana hyacintha 
 Ghatiana pulchra 
 Ghatiana rathbunae 
 Ghatiana rouxi 
 Ghatiana splendida

References 

Gecarcinucidae
Decapod genera